The enzyme chondroitin B lyase catalyzes the following process:

Eliminative cleavage of dermatan sulfate containing (1→4)-β-D-hexosaminyl and (1→3)-β-D-glucurosonyl or (1→3)-α-L-iduronosyl linkages to disaccharides containing 4-deoxy-β-D-gluc-4-enuronosyl groups to yield a 4,5-unsaturated dermatan-sulfate disaccharide (ΔUA-GalNAc-4S).
Glossary:	

This enzyme belongs to the family of lyases, specifically those carbon-oxygen lyases acting on polysaccharides.  The systematic name of this enzyme class is chondroitin B lyase. Other names in common use include chondroitinase B, ChonB, and ChnB.

References

 
 
 
 
 
 
 
 
 
 

EC 4.2.2
Enzymes of unknown structure